Bellary Naga is a 2009 Indian Kannada-language romantic action film starring Vishnuvardhan, Manasi and Avinash. The film is directed by Dinesh Babu and based on the Malayalam language film Rajamanikyam (2005) starring Mammootty This was the last film of Kannada superstar, Vishnuvardhan released just a couple of months before his death.

Cast
 Vishnuvardhan as Nagamanikya
 Mansi Pritam
 Avinash as Vishwanath Gowda
 Chitra Shenoy
 Ramesh Bhat
 Rajesh Krishnan
 Shobaraj
 Dharma
 Shivaram
 Bank Janardhan

Release
The film was released on 9 October 2009 all over Karnataka. This was the last film of Vishnuvardhan, released just before his death on 30 December 2009. School Master and Aptharakshaka were released posthumously.

Soundtrack
All the songs were composed and scored by L. N. Shastry.

Reception

Critical response 

The Times of India scored the film at 3.5 out of 5 stars and says ". L N Sastry has composed some good numbers. Preethi Vishnuvardhan needs special mention for her excellent costumes. Palaniraj and Pambal Ravi have choreographed some excellent fights." R G Vijayasarathy of Rediff.com scored the film at 3 out of 5 stars and wrote "L N Shashtri's composition of the hip hop song Jagwaare Jaagwaare Jaga and Hait Lagori are good. His background music too is plus point. As always, director Baboo ensures very good technical work. All in all Bellary Naga is a breezy and enjoyable entertainer.The New Indian Express wrote "Bellary Naga" is a breezy, likeable entertainer. Despite its loudness, the film will be a treat for the class audience because of Vishnu's rocking performance."

References

External links 

GGpedia Bellary naga
Movie review

2009 films
2000s Kannada-language films
Kannada remakes of Malayalam films
Indian action films
Films directed by Dinesh Baboo
2009 action films